Kevin Feeney (1952 – 14 August 2013) was a judge of the High Court in Ireland. Feeney was educated at Gonzaga College, University College Dublin and the King's Inns. He was called to the Bar in 1973, and became a senior counsel in 1991. He was appointed to the High Court in March 2006. He most notably heard part of the John Gilligan case in 2010. He died suddenly on 14 August 2013 in County Cork.

References 

1952 births
2013 deaths
High Court judges (Ireland)
Alumni of University College Dublin
People educated at Gonzaga College
Chairpersons of the Referendum Commission
Alumni of King's Inns